Ellan Vannin may refer to:

 the Manx name for the Isle of Man
 "Ellan Vannin" (poem), a poem and song, known as the alternative Isle of Man national anthem
 SS Ellan Vannin (1854), an iron-built packet steamer operated out of Castletown, Isle of Man
 SS Ellan Vannin (1883), an iron paddle steamer that foundered in 1909 with loss of 36 people
 "The Ellan Vannin Tragedy", a song by British folk group The Spinners
 Ellan Vannin football team